The Europeans of the Year award was established in 2001 by European Voice to honour influential European citizens who have mostly affected the European legislative and policy agenda. The annual award is officially supported by the Belgian Prime Minister Guy Verhofstadt. Every year, senior editors of European Voice and a panel of advisors from the European Community select 50 people who have had most influence on the European legislative and policy agenda in the past year. The list includes European Commissioners, MEPs, heads of state, politicians, EU functionaries, NGOs, campaigners and European citizens. Following a public poll, the results of which are announced at a gala dinner, the winners in different categories receive the "Europeans of the Year" awards.

References

External links
 The Europeans of the Year (archived as of February 2014)

Awards honoring politicians
European awards
Awards established in 2001